Hydatid may refer to:
 Echinococcosis
 Echinococcus granulosus, known as the hydatid tapeworm
 Hydatid of Morgagni
 Hydatidiform mole or hydatid mole